A regional election took place in Aquitaine on 21 March and 28 March 2004, along with all other regions. Alain Rousset (PS) was re-elected President of the Council.

Results

References

Aquitane
Politics of Aquitaine
March 2004 events in Europe